Northeastern Neo-Aramaic (NENA) is a grouping of related dialects of Neo-Aramaic spoken before World War I as a vernacular language by Jews and Christians between the Tigris and Lake Urmia, stretching north to Lake Van and southwards to Mosul and Kirkuk. As a result of the Sayfo (Assyrian genocide) Christian speakers were forced out of the area that is now Turkey and in the early 1950s most Jewish speakers moved to Israel. The Kurdish-Turkish conflict resulted in further dislocations of speaker populations.  As of the 1990s, the NENA group had an estimated number of fluent speakers among the Assyrians just below 500,000, spread throughout the Middle East and the Assyrian diaspora. In 2007, linguist Geoffrey Khan wrote that many dialects were nearing extinction with fluent speakers difficult to find.

The other branches of Neo-Aramaic are Western Neo-Aramaic, Central Neo-Aramaic (Turoyo and Mlahso), and Mandaic. Some linguists classify NENA as well as Turoyo and Mlahso as a single dialect continuum.

Influences
The NENA languages contain a large number of loanwords and some grammatical features from the extinct East Semitic Akkadian language of Mesopotamia (the original language of the Assyrians) and also in more modern times from their surrounding languages: Kurdish, Arabic, Persian, Azerbaijani and Turkish language. These languages are spoken by both Jews and Christian Assyrians from the area. Each variety of NENA is clearly Jewish or Assyrian.

However, not all varieties of one or other religious groups are intelligible with all others of the group. Likewise, in some places Jews and Assyrian Christians from the same locale speak mutually unintelligible varieties of Aramaic, where in other places their language is quite similar. The differences can be explained by the fact that NENA communities gradually became isolated into small groups spread over a wide area, and some had to be highly mobile due to various ethnic and religious persecutions.

The influence of classical Aramaic varieties – Syriac on Christian varieties and Targumic on Jewish communities – gives a dual heritage that further distinguishes language by faith. Many of the Jewish speakers of NENA varieties, the Kurdish Jews, now live in Israel, where Neo-Aramaic is endangered by the dominance of Modern Hebrew. Many Christian NENA speakers, who usually are Assyrian, are in diaspora in North America, Europe, Australia, the Caucasus and elsewhere, although indigenous communities remain in northern Iraq, south east Turkey, north east Syria and north west Iran, an area roughly comprising what had been ancient Assyria.

Grouping

SIL Ethnologue assigns ISO codes to twelve NENA varieties, two of them extinct:
 Neo-Syriac [syr] (Sooreth, Suret, Soorath, Soorith, Suras, Sureth), historically derived from the dialect of the Lake Urmia region, now mostly spoken in Iranian Azerbaijan and northern Iraq.
 Assyrian Neo-Aramaic  [aii], 235,000 speakers (1994)
 Chaldean Neo-Aramaic  [cld], 216,000 speakers (1994)
Judeo-Aramaic varieties, spoken by Jewish communities in Israel
 Barzani Jewish Neo-Aramaic  [bjf] (Israel), extinct
 Hulaulá or Judeo-Aramaic [huy], 10,000 speakers (1990s)
 Jewish Assyrian Neo-Aramaic (Iraq, Iran, Turkey)
 Lishana Deni  [lsd] 7,500 speakers (1990s)
 Lishán Didán  [trg], 4,500 speakers (2000)
 Lishanid Noshan  [aij], 2,200 speakers (1990s)
 Bohtan Neo-Aramaic  [bhn] (Georgia), 1,000 speakers (1990s)
 Hértevin  [hrt] (Turkey), 1,000 speakers (1990s)
 Koy Sanjaq Surat  [kqd] (Iraq), 900 speakers (1990s)
 Senaya  [syn] (Iran), 460 speakers (1990s)

References

Sources 

Eastern Aramaic languages
Neo-Aramaic languages
Languages of Azerbaijan
Languages of Turkey
Languages of Iran
Languages of Iraq
Languages of Israel